Geormbeeyi Adali-Mortty (born 1916) is a Ghanaian poet and writer.

Life
In 1958 Adali-Mortty joined the advisory committee of the international literary journal Black Orpheus.

He was a contributor to the 1958 anthology Voices of Ghana: Literary Contributions to the Ghana Broadcasting System, 1955–57, edited by Henry Swanzy, and contributed both poetry and political commentary to the Legon Observer: for example, "A Spent Scare" (1967) was written in response to the coup that ended Nkrumah's rule.

Works
 "Ewe Poetry", Black Orpheus, No. 4 (1958), 36-45
 "The Spent Scare", The Legon Observer, 2:5 (3 March 1967), pp. 21–2
 (ed. with Kofi Awoonor) Messages: Poems from Ghana, Heinemann, 1971. African Writers Series 42
 "Change of Government to the Spoils System Again?", The Legon Observer 9: 4 (1974)
 'Reply to Kwabena Manu's Rejoinder to "Change of Government to the Spoils System Again?"', The Legon Observer, 9:6 (1974), p. 166

References

1916 births
Possibly living people
Ghanaian male poets
20th-century Ghanaian poets
20th-century male writers